The Copa Adrián C. Escobar was an official Argentine football cup competition contested by clubs of Argentina, organized by the Argentine Football Association (AFA) from 1939 to 1949.

The trophy of the tournament was donated by Adrián C. Escobar, president of the AFA in 1939, year in which the match was created. Therefore, the tournament was named after his donation.

Format
It was a heptagonal competition, competed by the seven best placed teams in the table of Primera División championship. A single knockout system was adopted. The second to seven competed in the quarter-finals, while the champions of the official league entered the semi-finals directly. 

Matches in this tournament were not standard. In the 1939 edition, a match lasted for 20 minutes in the quarter-finals and semi-finals and 30 minutes for the final match. In the later editions, matches lasted for 40 minutes in every round. When matches were drawn, the team gaining the higher number of corner kicks would proceed to the next round. The matches in the same round were played in the same pitch on the same day.

List of champions
The following list includes all the editions of the Copa Adrián C. Escobar:

Titles by team

Topscorers 
Source:

References

E
Ade
Recurring sporting events established in 1939
Recurring events disestablished in 1949